de la Peña or Peña is a topographic surname originally given to someone living near a cliff. It is used in Spanish, Catalan, Portuguese, and Galician names. It is the 2,469th most common surname in the world and is most prevalent in the United States.

History 
The origin of the surname de la Peña (also Peña) is in present-day Galicia, Spain.  It derives from the word "penna," which typically describes a prominent rock or fortress.

Notable people with the name 
Captain General Don Manuel la Peña fl.(1808–1811), sometimes referred to as Lapeña, was a Spanish military officer who served during the Peninsular War (Guerra de la Independencia Española).
Don Manuel de la Peña y Peña (1789–1850) was a Mexican politician and lawyer, interim president of Mexico from September to November 1847 and president from January 1848 to June 1848.
Don Lucas de Zafra-Vazquez y Tallada, de la Plaza y de la Peña, Marquess de los Arenales, Señor de Castril in Granada.
Don Ramón María del Valle-Inclán y de la Peña, Marquess de Bradomin, (1866–1936) was a Spanish dramatist, novelist and member of the Spanish Generation of 98.
Don Gaspar Castellano y de la Peña, Count de Castellano was a Spanish author.
Don José González de la Peña y Rodríguez de la Encina, Barón de Forna (1887–1961) was a Spanish portrait painter and artist, and consul general of Spain in Venezuela.
Luis Sáenz Peña (1822–1907), President of Argentina (1892–1895)
Roque Sáenz Peña (1851–1914), President of Argentina (1910–1914)
Pedro Pablo Peña Cañete (1864–1943), President of Paraguay (1912)
Stefan de la Peña fl. (1969–2004), intellectual and philosopher of epistemology
Don Alfonso Peña Boeuf (1888–1966) was Minister of Transport in the Spanish Government (1938–1945) during the Francoist State
Don Ricardo Enrique Pallasa de la Peña III (1853–1898), Barón de Azucar and General of the Spanish Naval fleet in the Philippines (1893–1898)
Don Pedro Juan de la Peña (1855–1945), personal chef to King Alfonso XIII (1885-1905)
José Manuel Castañón de la Peña (1920–2001), was a Spanish writer born in Pola de Lena (Asturias) who lived in exile in Venezuela during the Francoist State.
Adam de la Peña, American voice actor, comedy writer, producer, and director

Holders of Spanish titles of nobility in the 19th and 20th centuries
People with the surname de la Peña or Peña who held a title of nobility in Spain in more recent years include:
Don Ramiro Pérez-Maura y de la Peña, Grandee of Spain, Duke de Maura and Count de Mortera (granted in 1930 and 1876 respectively)
Don Antonio González de Aguilar y de la Peña, Marquess de Arenal (granted in 1847)
Don Magín Peña y Lorca, Marquess de Ogijares (granted in 1889)
Doña Marina Peña y Paradela, Countess de Gaviria (granted in 1837)
Doña Helena de la Peña y Robles, Countess de Xauen (granted in 1929)
Doña Matilde Francisca Barriouevo y Peña, Vincountess de Barrionuevo (granted in 1891)
Don Reynaldo Enriques De la Pena, oldest son, last with royal family blood

Bibliography 
Elenco de grandezas y títulos nobiliarios españoles 2006 (Ampelio Alonso de Cadenas y López/Hidalguía)
Blasonario de la consanguinidad ibérica 1980

Catalan-language surnames
Galician-language surnames
Portuguese-language surnames
Spanish-language surnames